Jorge Lozano (born 17 May 1963) is a retired professional tennis player from Mexico. He reached his highest doubles ranking of World No. 4 in August 1988. His highest singles ranking was World No. 51, achieved the following month. During his career, he won two mixed doubles titles at the French Open: in 1988 with Lori McNeil and in 1990 with Arantxa Sánchez. He reached the round of 16 in singles at the 1988 US Open and also the semifinal in doubles that same year. Qualified twice for the Doubles Masters at the Royal Albert Hall in London and reached the semifinals in 1988. In his career, he won nine doubles titles, but no singles titles. He turned professional in 1986, and in his career He was the first player to be beaten by Pete Sampras in the main draw of a Grand Slam tournament, at the French Open in 1989. In Davis Cup play, represented Mexico for 15 years, 1981–1995, won 12 doubles matches, and lost 12 as well. He lost 11 singles matches, and won 8, making his overall win / loss record at the Davis Cup 20–23. Lozano won his first title at Forest Hills in 1988, with his partner Todd Witsken, and won his last at Athens in 1993. He resides in Guadalajara, Mexico where he directs a tennis academy for kids and also coaches the men and women tennis team at the University Tec de Monterrey. He was the captain of the Mexican Davis Cup Team from 2007 to 2014. He is now the Athletic Director for the University Tec de Monterrey, campus Guadalajara.

Grand Slam finals

Mixed doubles: (2 wins)

Career finals

Doubles (9 wins, 13 losses)

External links
 
 
 

Mexican male tennis players
Living people
1963 births
Sportspeople from San Luis Potosí
French Open champions
Grand Slam (tennis) champions in mixed doubles
Pan American Games medalists in tennis
Pan American Games silver medalists for Mexico
Tennis players at the 1983 Pan American Games
Central American and Caribbean Games medalists in tennis
Central American and Caribbean Games gold medalists for Mexico
Central American and Caribbean Games silver medalists for Mexico
20th-century Mexican people